This is a list of aircraft types having triplane wings.

! Type
! Country
! Date
! Role
! Status
! Notes
|-
|Albatros Dr.I || Germany || 1917 || Fighter || Prototype || Based on the Albatros D.V biplane.
|-
|Albatros Dr.II || Germany || 1918 || Fighter || Prototype || Based on the Albatros D.X biplane.
|-
|American Flea || USA || data-sort-value="1939.5"|c. 1939 || Private || Homebuilt || Triplane variant of the Mignet Pou du Ciel. Lower wing plane is all-moving ailerons.
|-
|Armstrong Whitworth F.K.5 || United Kingdom || 1915 || Fighter || Prototype || Never flown. Middle wing longer span than the others.
|-
|Armstrong Whitworth F.K.6 || United Kingdom || 1916 || Fighter || Prototype || Middle wing longer span than the others.
|-
|Astoux-Vedrines || France || data-sort-value="1916.5"|c. 1916 || Experimental || Prototype || Wing incidence could be varied in flight. 
|-
|Austin Osprey || United Kingdom || 1918 || Fighter || Prototype || 
|-
|Aviatik 30.24 || Austria-Hungary || 1917 || Fighter || Prototype || Based on the Aviatik (Berg) D.I biplane.
|-
|Avro 547 || United Kingdom || 1920 || Transport || Prototype || 2 built. Based on the Avro 504, with a third wing added.
|-
Several short flights or hops.
|-
|Bell Oionus I || Canada || 1910 || Experimental || Prototype || Failed to fly. Triplane variant of Bell's octahedral wing.
|-
|Berliner Helicopter No.5 || USA || 1923 || Experimental || Prototype || In 1923, the Helicopter incorporated triplane wings to allow for gliding in case of an engine failure.
|-
|Besson H-3 || France || 1921 || Private ||  || or Besson MB.12
|-
|Besson H-5 || France || 1922 || Transport flying boat || Prototype || 
|-
|Besson H-6 || France || 1921 || Patrol ||  || Mailplane. Lower wing the largest and top wing the smallest.
|-
|Besson LB || France || 1919 || Patrol ||  || Flying boat
|-
|Besson HB.2 || France ||  ||  ||  || 
|-
|Besson MB-10 || France ||  ||  ||  || 
|-
|Besson MB-11 || France ||  ||  ||  || 
|-
|Besson Hydravion école || France || 1919 ||  ||  || Flying boat, exhibited at the 1919 Paris Aero Show.
|-
||Blackburn Triplane || United Kingdom || 1917 || Fighter || Prototype || Pusher propeller and boom-mounted empennage to allow an upwards-firing 2-pounder recoilless gun.
|-
|Boeing GA-1 || USA || 1920 || Attack || Production || Heavily armoured twin. 10 ordered, not operational.
|-
| Bousson-Borgnis triplane || France || 1908 ||  || Bomber || Canard. Failed to fly.
|-
||Bristol Braemar || United Kingdom || 1918 || Bomber || Prototype || Mk II flown in 1919. 
|-
||Bristol Pullman || United Kingdom || 1920 || Transport || Prototype || The Bristol Pullman 14-seat transport variant flew in 1920.
|-
||Bristol Tramp || United Kingdom || 1921 || Transport || Prototype || 2 built, never flown.
|-
| Caproni Ca.4 || Italy || 1914 || Bomber || Production || Military designation of a line of bombers which would also see airliner variants. Types include the Ca.40,41,42,43,48,51,52,58,59.
|-
|Caproni Ca.40 || Italy || 1914 || Bomber || Prototype || 3 built.
|-
|Caproni Ca.41 || Italy || 1918 || Bomber || Production || Re-engined Ca.40.
|-
|Caproni Ca.42 || Italy || 1918 || Bomber || Production || Re-engined Ca.41.
|-
|Caproni Ca.43 || Italy || 1918 || Bomber || Prototype || Floatplane variant of the Ca.4.
|-
|Caproni Ca.48 || Italy || 1919 || Transport ||  || Converted from surplus Ca.42.
|-
||Caproni Ca.49 || Italy || 1919 || Transport || Project || Seaplane.
|-
|Caproni Ca.51 || Italy ||  || Bomber ||  || Ca.42 variant with biplane tail and tail gun.
|-
|Caproni Ca.52 || Italy || 1918 || Bomber || Production || Ca.42 built for the RNAS. Six built.
|-
| Caproni Ca 53 || Italy || 1917 || Bomber || Prototype || 1 completed, never flown. Preserved in the Gianni Caproni Museum of Aeronautics.
|-
| Caproni Ca.54 || Italy || 1919 || Transport ||  || Conversion of the Caproni Ca 53.
|-
| Caproni Ca.55 || Italy || 1920 || Transport ||  || Seaplane derived from the Caproni Ca 54.
|-
|Caproni Ca.58 || Italy ||  || Transport ||  || Ca.48 re-engined with Fiat A.14 or Isotta Fraschini V.6.
|-
|Caproni Ca.59 || Italy ||  || Transport || Project || Designation of Ca.58 intended for customers outside Italy.
|-
| Caproni Ca.60 || Italy  || 1921 || Transport || Prototype || The "Noviplano" was a triple tandem triplane which crashed on its maiden flight.
|-
| Caproni-Pensuti triplane || Italy || 1920 || Private ||  ||
|-
||Catron & Fisk CF-10 || USA || data-sort-value="1925.5"|c. 1925 || Transport ||  ||  
|-
|Curtiss 18-T || USA || 1918 || Fighter || Production || Known variously as the "Wasp" and the "Kirkham".
|-
|Curtiss Autoplane || USA || 1917 || Private || Prototype || Flying car. Flew only short hops.
|-
|Curtiss BT || USA || 1917 || Utility || Prototype || Seaplane, referred to as the "Flying lifeboat" or "Baby T".
|-
|Curtiss Model FL || USA ||1917 ||  || Prototype || Flying boat comprising Model F hull with Model L wings.
|-
|Curtiss GS-1 || USA || 1918 || Fighter || Prototype || Floatplane.
|-
||Curtiss Model L || USA || 1916 || Trainer || Production || Landplane and floatplane variants.
|-
||Curtiss Model S || USA || 1917 ||  Fighter || Production || S-4 and S-5 were floatplanes.
|-
|Curtiss Model T || USA || 1916 || Patrol || Prototype || Flying boat. Known as the "Wanamaker"
|-
|Curtiss-Judson Triplane || USA ||1917 || Utility flying boat || Operational || Flying boat. Slightly enlarged triplane version of the standard Curtiss F-Boat.
|-
| Curiss-Cox racer || USA || 1921 || Private || Operational || Also called the "Cactus kitten", a one-off triplane conversion of Cox's "Texas wildcat".
|-
| Dorand 1908 triplane || France || 1908 ||  || Prototype || Military triplane.
|-
||Dufaux triplane || Switzerland || 1908 || Experimental || Prototype || Tandem triplane with biplane tail and tiltrotor. Failed to fly.
|-
| Dunne-Huntington Triplane || UK || data-sort-value="1910.5"|1910 or 1911 || Experimental || Prototype || Not strictly a triplane but a three-surface aircraft, having a pair of tandem wings with a third set above and between them, but referred to as a "triplane" by its designer, J. W. Dunne.
|-
| DFW T.34 II || Germany || 1917 || Fighter || Prototype || 
|-
||Ellehammer triplane || Denmark || 1907 || Experimental || Prototype || First powered triplane to fly.
|-
| Euler Dreidecker Type 1 || Germany || 1916 || Trainer || Prototype || 
|-
| Euler Dreidecker Type 2 || Germany || 1917 || Fighter || Prototype || Later modified as a biplane.
|-
| Euler Dreidecker Type 3 || Germany || 1917 || Fighter || Prototype || Later modified as a biplane. 
|-
| Euler Dreidecker Type 4 || Germany || 1918 || Fighter || Prototype || 
|-
| Euler Dreidecker Type 5 || Germany || 1918 || Fighter || Prototype || Triplane variant of the Euler Vierdecker quadruplane.
|-
| Faccioli Triplane || Italy || 1909 || Experimental || Prototype || Crashed after a short hop.
|-
| Farman Voisin || France || 1908 || Experimental || Prototype || Original Voisin machine modified to a triplane.
|-
|Felixstowe Fury || United Kingdom || 1918 || Long-range flying boat || Prototype || Flying boat. Also known as the Porte Super-Baby
|-
|Fokker Dr.1 || Germany || 1917 || Fighter || Production || Braced variant of the V.4, first flown as the V.5
|-
|Fokker V.4 || Germany || 1917 || Fighter || Prototype || Cantilever wings.
|-
|Fokker V.6 || Germany || 1917 || Fighter || Prototype || 
|-
|Fokker V.8 || Germany || 1917 || Fighter || Prototype || Tandem design, having a triplane fore wing, biplane rear wing and monoplane tail stabiliser.
|-
| Friedrichshafen FF.60 || Germany || 1918 || Experimental || Prototype || Floatplane
|-
| Goupy No.1 || France || 1908 || Experimental || Prototype || 
|-
| Grade triplane || Germany || 1908 || Experimental || Prototype || Hans Grade. first German-built aeroplane to fly
|-
| Groos triplane || France || 1909 || Experimental || Prototype || Alfred Groos' second design was a triplane which failed to fly.
|-
| Hansa-Brandenburg CC Triplane || Germany || 1917  || Fighter || Prototype || Seaplane. One-off triplane variant of production biplane.
|-
| Hansa-Brandenburg L.16 || Germany || 1917 || Fighter || Prototype || 
|-
| Hansa-Brandenburg W.17 || Germany || 1917  || Fighter || Prototype || Seaplane. Cantilever bottom wing.
|-
|Labourdette-Halbronn H.T.1 || France || 1918 || Bomber || Prototype || 1 flown. Twin-hulled flying boat.
|-
|Labourdette-Halbronn H.T.2 || France || 1919 || Bomber || Prototype || 2 flown. Development of the H.T.1 
|-
|Levy-Besson Alerte || France || 1917 || Patrol || Production || Flying boat. Centre wing longer than the others. 100 built, used for patrol and ASW bombing rather than the "Alerte" role.
|-
|Levy-Besson 450-hp || France || 1918 ||  ||  || Flying boat 
|-
|Levy-Besson 300-hp || France || data-sort-value="1918.5"|c. 1918 ||  ||  || Flying boat. Under construction in 1918 
|-
|Levy-Besson 500-hp || France || data-sort-value="1918.5"|c. 1918 ||  ||  || Flying boat never completed?
|-
|Levy-Besson High Seas || France || data-sort-value="1919.5"|c. 1919 ||  || Production || Flying boat. Production batch of 100 was cancelled after some had been completed. Top and centre wings of equal span, bottom wing shorter.
|-
| Levy Besson HB.2 || France || 1919 ||  ||  || 
|-
| LFG Roland D.IV || Germany || 1917 || Fighter || Prototype || Also known as the Dr. I.
|-
| Lloyd 40.15 || Austria-Hungary || 1917 || Fighter || Prototype || 
|-
| Lohner Typ A || Austria-Hungary || 1917 || Fighter || Prototype || Later redesignated the 111.04.
|-
|Mitsubishi 1MT || Japan || 1922 || Bomber || Production || Navy Type 10.
|-
|Morane-Saulnier TRK || France || 1915 || Bomber || Prototype || 1 built.
|-
|Naval Aircraft Factory Giant Boat || USA || 1919 || Patrol || Prototype || Flying boat. Never completed.
|-
|| Nieuport 10 Triplane || France || 1915 || Fighter || Prototype || Extreme backwards stagger of top plane.
|-
|| Nieuport 17 Triplane || France || 1916 || Fighter || Prototype || Extreme backwards stagger of top plane.
|-
|| Nieuport 17bis Triplane || France || 1917 || Fighter || Prototype || Extreme backwards stagger of top plane.
|-
|| Nieuport London || UK || 1920 || Bomber || Prototype || Planned night bomber
|-
| Oeffag Type CF || Austria-Hungary || 1918 || Fighter || Prototype || 
|-
| Parnall Possum || UK || 1923 || Experimental || Prototype || Research into centrally-mounted engine.
|-
| Pfalz Dr-Typ || Germany || 1917 || Fighter || Prototype || Based on the Pfalz D.III biplane.
|-
| Pfalz Dr.I || Germany || 1918 || Fighter || Prototype || Pre-series batch of 10 delivered.
|-
| Pfalz Dr.II || Germany || 1918 || Fighter || Prototype || 
|-
| Richter triplane || Germany || 1923 || Private || Prototype || Hang-glider. One of several types flown by Hans Richter having varying numbers of planes.
|-
| Rodjestveisky triplane || Russia || 1911 || Experimental || Prototype || 
|-
| Roe I Triplane || United Kingdom || 1909 || Experimental || Prototype || Has been described as a tandem triplane due to its relatively large triplane aft plane.
|-
| Roe II Triplane || United Kingdom || 1910 || Experimental || Prototype || 2 built.
|-
| Roe III Triplane || United Kingdom || 1910  || Private || Production || Small number sold.
|-
| Roe IV Triplane || United Kingdom || 1910 || Experimental || Prototype || 
|-
| Sablatnig SF.4Dr || Germany || 1917 || Fighter || Prototype || Floatplane. Redesigned triplane variant of the SF.4 biplane. 
|-
| || Soviet Union || 1922 || Bomber ||  ||
|-
| Schütte-Lanz Dr.I || Germany || 1917 || Fighter || Prototype || 
|-
| Siemens-Schuckert Dr.I || Germany || 1917 || Fighter || Prototype || 
|-
| Siemens-Schuckert DDr.I || Germany || 1917 || Fighter || Prototype || 
|-
|Sopwith Cobham || United Kingdom || 1919 || Bomber || Prototype || 3 flown
|-
|Sopwith Hispano-Suiza Triplane || United Kingdom || 1916 || Fighter || Prototype || 2 flown.
|-
|Sopwith L.R.T.Tr. || United Kingdom || 1916 || Fighter || Prototype || Combined escort fighter and airship interceptor.
|-
|Sopwith Rhino || United Kingdom || 1917 || Bomber || Prototype || 2 flown
|-
|Sopwith Snark || United Kingdom || 1919 || Fighter || Prototype || 3 flown
|-
|Sopwith Triplane || United Kingdom || 1916 || Fighter || Production || First military triplane in service.
|-
| Stringfellow triplane || United Kingdom || 1868 || Experimental || Project || John Stringfellow showed his design at the world's first aeronautical exhibition, at the Crystal Palace, London.
|-
| Tarrant Tabor || United Kingdom || 1919 || Bomber || Prototype || Crashed on its maiden flight.
|-
|Voisin Triplane || France || 1916 || Bomber || Prototype || 3 flown
|-
|Witteman-Lewis XNBL-1 || USA || 1923 || Bomber || Prototype || also known as "Barling Bomber". Same designer as Tabor.
|-
| W.K.F. 80.05 || Austria-Hungary || 1917 || Fighter || Prototype || 
|}

References
Citations

Bibliography

 Angelucci, E. and P. Matricardi (1977). World Aircraft - Origins-World War 1. London: Sampson Low.

 Jane, F.T. All the World's Aircraft 1913 (1913). London: Sampson Low, facsimile reprint David & Charles, 1969.

Lists of aircraft by wing configuration